John Hood may refer to:

People
John Hood (MP, fl.1393–99), English politician, MP for Leominster
John Hood (MP, fl.1421–29), English politician, MP for Leominster
John Hood (inventor) (1720–1783), Irish surveyor and inventor
John Hood (Australian politician) (c. 1817–1877), member of the Victorian Legislative Council, and later, the Victorian Legislative Assembly
John Bell Hood (1831–1879), Confederate general during American Civil War
John Hood (painter) (1839–1924), South Australian painter
John Mifflin Hood (1843–1906), American railroad executive
John Hood (naval officer) (1859–1919), rear admiral of the United States Navy during World War I
John Hood (diplomat) (1904–1991), Australian diplomat
John Linsley Hood (1925–2004), British electronics designer
John Hood (university administrator) (born 1952), New Zealand businessman and university administrator, vice chancellor of the University of Oxford (2004–09)

Ship
USS John Hood (DD-655), a Fletcher-class destroyer of the United States Navy

See also

Hood (surname)
John Cockburn-Hood (1844–1902), English cricketer

Hood, John